Baloch Nationalist Army (BNA) (Urdu: بلوچ نیشنلسٹ آرمی) is a militant group, fighting for the separation of Balochistan. The group was formed on January 11, 2022, out of a merger of the Baloch Republican Army (BRA), and the United Baloch Army (UBA). BRA and UBA also announced their dissolution following the establishment of Baloch Nationalist Army.

Attacks

2022 Lahore Blast 

On 20 January 2022, at least three people were killed and over 20 others were injured by a bombing in Lahore, Punjab, Pakistan. At 1:40pm, a 1.5 kilogram improvised explosive device exploded on a motorcycle parked next to a pushcart outside a bank in a busy market chowk in the Anarkali area of the city. It broke windows of nearby buildings and set fire to several parked motorcycles. The attack was claimed on Twitter by a spokesman for the Baloch Nationalist Army.

The blast in Lahore was strongly condemned by leader of Baloch nationalist groups like Mehran Marri and Brahumdagh Bugti. The condemnation by the leaders of Nationalist group highlighted the clash between the leaders of terrorists groups aboard and by the fighters on ground.

2022 Panjgur and Naushki raids

References 

Organisations designated as terrorist by Pakistan
Baloch nationalist militant groups
Balochistan
National liberation movements